Kwadwo Poku or Kwadwo Opoku may refer to:

 Kwadwo Poku (footballer, born 1985), Ghanaian professional footballer
 Kwadwo Poku (footballer, born 1992), Ghanaian footballer
 Kwadwo Poku (footballer, born 1993), Ghanaian footballer

See also
 Kwadwo Opoku, born 2001, Ghanaian footballer